Hugh Cross (24 September 1925 – 14 May 1989) was a British television and film actor.

Selected filmography
 Just William's Luck (1947)
 William Comes to Town (1948)
 Warning to Wantons (1949)
 Seven Days to Noon (1950)
 Svengali (1954)
 The Court Martial of Major Keller (1961)
 Highway to Battle (1961)

References

External links
 

1925 births
1989 deaths
English male film actors
English male television actors
Male actors from London
20th-century English male actors